Daniel Gratton (born December 7, 1966) is a Canadian former professional ice hockey player.

He was drafted by the Los Angeles Kings with the 10th overall pick in the 1985 NHL Entry Draft. He would go on to play in only 7 NHL games.  He scored his only NHL goal on February 6, 1988, in a 7-2 Kings' win against visiting Edmonton.

Career statistics

Regular season and playoffs

International

Coaching career

External links

Hockey Draft Central
President, Gratton Infrared - Dan Gratton's Current Career in Toronto, Canada

1966 births
Living people
Belleville Bulls players
Brantford Smoke players
Canadian ice hockey centres
Flint Generals players
Hamilton Canucks players
Kalamazoo Wings (1974–2000) players
Los Angeles Kings draft picks
Los Angeles Kings players
Muskegon Fury players
National Hockey League first-round draft picks
New Haven Nighthawks players
Oshawa Generals players
Ottawa 67's players
Ice hockey people from Ontario
SC Lyss players
Sportspeople from Brantford